New Plymouth Boys' High School is a single-sex boys' state secondary school in New Plymouth, Taranaki, New Zealand.

The school currently caters for approximately 1300 students, including 210 boarders, on its  site.

The school often collaborates with the very close-by New Plymouth Girls' High School. For example, the Hillary Challenge team for New Plymouth always draws students from both schools and the jazz band and concert band include musicians from both schools.

History
New Plymouth Boys' High School was established in 1878 by an Act of Parliament and was officially opened in 1882; the school celebrated its 125th Jubilee in 2007.

Thomas Shailer Weston was for some time a governor of the school.

Pridham Hall 
Pridham Hall, named after the first headmaster Ernest Pridham, a Master of the Arts graduate from Dublin, is one of the heritage buildings from New Plymouth, registered by Heritage New Zealand as a Category 1 Historic Place.

Designed by the New Zealand architect William Cumming, Pridham Hall was built between 1918-1919 by Boon Bros of New Plymouth and it was for a very long time the main building of the school. It is made of reinforced concrete with a roughcast exterior, and a pressed metal tiles roof with a large roof lantern on the north façade. On the west wing of the building there is a large Elizabethan style window and a large balcony on the front façade towards the cricket ground. Pridham Hall has a large assembly hall featuring timber panelling and wooden columns and several classrooms and laboratories built around it. The building suffered from a serious fire in 1925, that destroyed the classrooms in the South-Eastern corner, affecting also the roof of the assembly hall. The damage was repaired again by the Boon Bros later that year.

Principals
 Ernest Pridham (1882–1911)
 Bill Moyes (1912–1941)
 Jack McNaught (1942–1957)
 John Webster (1958–1967)
 Wit Alexander (1968–1971)
 Geoff Cramond (1972–1978)
 Tom Ryder (1979–1995)
 Lyal French-Wright (1995–2008)
 Michael McMenamin (2008–2015)
 Paul Verić (2015–2019)
 Sam Moore (2019–present)

Houses
New Plymouth Boys' High School currently has four houses. Students are sorted alphabetically into their houses, with the exception of Hatherly, which consists of boarders only.
 Barak – green
 Donnelly – blue
 Hatherly – red
 Syme – yellow

Huia Ropū system
Huia Ropū (formerly called Groups) is a class attended by all students on Tuesdays and Wednesdays before first period (between 8:35am and 9:00am). In the class, students learn about a variety of topics, including time management, mindfulness, anti-bullying, goal setting and career path planning, among others. Students stay in their Huia group throughout their time in school. There are up to 16 ropū per house, and each ropū is referenced by the first letter of its house followed by its number (e.g. D13 for Donnelly #13).

Facilities
In 2008, the school acquired a new wing (now known as the French-Wright Block, named for the former headmaster Lyal French-Wright ) with facilities for administration, science and mathematics. The wing incorporates modern architecture to add a new flavor to the traditional school. The wing was opened by the prime minister at the time, Helen Clark. 

The school has a boarding hostel, providing accommodation for up to 200 boys.

Student-based radio station
New Plymouth Boys' High also had their own radio station named "Gully FM" (however this is discontinued), as the school's "Gully Grounds" (the terrace-style rugby field of Boys' High) are a major part of New Plymouth Boys' High. Gully FM broadcast locally to New Plymouth on 87.9 FM. Gully FM was founded in 2011 after a small group of students got together and put forward a proposal to the headmaster. Gully FM mainly broadcast pop, modern rock and dubstep aimed at the students of the school.

United Space School
New Plymouth Boys' High School and New Plymouth Girls' High School are the only New Zealand schools to take part in the Foundation for International Space Education's United Space School which is held in Houston, Texas each year.  One student from each school (and in 2009 a teacher), is selected to attend.

Exchange programme
A student exchange program has been established with a Chilean High School, Colegio San Nicolás de Myra, so that every year students alternate exchanges between New Plymouth and Santiago. In 2006, NPBHS travelled to Chile for the first time, and the next year students from Chile came to NPBHS in return. This exchange has continued into the present, and is run through NPBHS by Tineka Twigley. The school also associates with schools in New Plymouth's sister cities in China and Japan.

Controversy over bullying
After an incident in 2008 when a boarder was beaten by four other students the school's board of trustees commissioned an independent report on bullying in November 2008. The report, released in late January 2009, identified a culture of bullying amongst students in the school's hostel, although the school's board of trustees disputed some of the report's findings. A 2010 Education Review Office review of the school did not highlight any bullying issues, and gave the school a positive report.

Notable alumni

Many successful men have come from the school, including Australian Idol winner Stan Walker, musicians Matt Thomas, Hayden Chisholm, former Chief of the Royal New Zealand Navy Rear Admiral Tony Parr, David Gauld (president of the New Zealand Mathematical Society 1981–82), the author and journalist John McBeth, and 24 All Blacks.

In 2018, Professor Emeritus David Penny received one of the highest honours in the science world, to be named a National Academy of Sciences (NAS) foreign associate.

Members of Parliament who attended the school include Andrew Little, John Armstrong, Bruce Beetham, Merv Wellington, Cam Calder and Ken Comber. Harry Barker was mayor of Gisborne for 27 years.

Australian media personality and Senator for Victoria, Australia Derryn Hinch attended New Plymouth Boys' High.

See also
 List of schools in New Zealand

References

External links
 New Plymouth Boys' High School Website
 A Boarders Life – Social Network Website with Photos and Anecdotes from the 1960s
 Gully FM

Boarding schools in New Zealand
Boys' schools in New Zealand
Educational institutions established in 1882
Secondary schools in Taranaki
Schools in New Plymouth
1882 establishments in New Zealand